California's 34th State Senate district is one of 40 California State Senate districts. It is currently represented by Democrat Tom Umberg of Santa Ana.

District profile 
The district encompasses part of northern Orange County, including Santa Ana, Little Saigon, and several beachfront communities. It also includes a portion of Long Beach. The primarily suburban district is ethnically and socioeconomically diverse.

Los Angeles County – 0.6%
 Long Beach – 13.3%

Orange County – 28.8%
 Anaheim – 20.2%
 Fountain Valley
 Garden Grove
 Huntington Beach – 48.1%
 Los Alamitos
 Midway City
 Orange – 7.4%
 Rossmoor
 Santa Ana
 Seal Beach
 Westminster

Election results from statewide races

List of senators 
Due to redistricting, the 34th district has been moved around different parts of the state. The current iteration resulted from the 2011 redistricting by the California Citizens Redistricting Commission.

Election results 1992 - present

2018

2014

2010

2006

2002

1998

1994

See also 
 California State Senate
 California State Senate districts
 Districts in California

References

External links 
 District map from the California Citizens Redistricting Commission

34
Government of Los Angeles County, California
Government in Orange County, California
Government of Anaheim, California
Government in Long Beach, California
Fountain Valley, California
Garden Grove, California
Huntington Beach, California
Los Alamitos, California
Rossmoor, California
Orange, California
Santa Ana, California
Seal Beach, California
Westminster, California